Cophixalus biroi is a species of frog in the family Microhylidae found in New Guinea. Its natural habitats are subtropical or tropical moist lowland forests and subtropical or tropical moist montane forests.

References

biroi
Amphibians of New Guinea
Taxonomy articles created by Polbot
Amphibians described in 1901